Alexander M. Gillespie is Pro Vice-Chancellor for Research and Professor of Law,  specialising in international law related to war, the environment and civil liberties, at the University of Waikato. He has served on international delegations including UNESCO, advised the New Zealand government on social issues and made a number of appearances before the Waitangi Tribunal. Gillespie frequently takes public positions on global conflict, climate change, refugees and environmental issues in the New Zealand media and has published seventeen books. He has won international and New Zealand awards in recognition of his understanding of how international law impacts society.

Education and career
Gillespie obtained a (LLB) and (LLM) with Honours from The University of Auckland, a PhD at University of Nottingham and post-doctoral studies at Columbia University in New York City. As of 2022, Gillespie is a professor at The University of Waikato, and an external member of the NZ Centre for Environmental Law, a research centre hosted by Auckland Law School at the University of Auckland.  In the Auckland staff profile, it was noted that Gillespie had advised the New Zealand Government on legal matters and provided some commissioned work for the United Nations. In 2005, Gillespie was named Rapporteur for the World Heritage Convention as part of  UNESCO. Gillespie was a  professor at the Faculty of Law and Criminology of Ghent University (Department of European, Public and International Law) for six months, spanning 2018 and 2019. He said of his time at Ghent, that he was impressed by young Belgiums as "agents of change...[who were]... very pragmatic, with a healthy distrust of authority."

Advisory roles
Gillespie has been involved in advising the New Zealand Government on social issues and in 2018 was acknowledged for his work on reviewing an earlier draft of  A Zero Carbon Act for New Zealand: Revisiting Stepping stones to Paris and beyond, a report prepared for the New Zealand Government by Simon Upton in his capacity as The Parliamentary Commissioner for the Environment.

Between 2016 and 2018, Gillespie provided advisory assistance to Tūhonohono, a research project that aimed to establish how mātauranga and tikanga Māori could be fully applied in the marine environment of New Zealand, specifically in regard to compatibility with marine policies and law in the country. In a report of the research it was concluded that there needed to be  "more inclusive and better resource management policies, practices and laws that enable the accurate application of tikanga and mātauranga Māori to the governance and management of the country's land-based and marine ecosystems...[and the]... emphasis should be on power-sharing arrangements that are suitable for Māori, suitable for the environment and therefore suitable for the nation". The report suggested that government statutes and regulations should be reviewed to ensure decisions were consistent with the Treaty of Waitangi.

WAI 262, commonly referred to as The Indigenous Flora and Fauna and Cultural Intellectual property Claim , was lodged with the Waitangi Tribunal on 9 October 1991 by six iwi in New Zealand. The report on the claim released in 2011, recommended: Reform of laws, policies or practices relating to health, education, science, intellectual property, indigenous flora and fauna, resource management, conservation, the Māori language, arts and culture, heritage, and the involvement of Māori in the development of New Zealand's positions on international instruments affecting indigenous rights. Gillespie, who made an appearance in front of the Waitangi Tribunal on this claim, suggested that before responding to the report, the New Zealand Government should consider how Canada, Australia and the United States had dealt the same issues. While he acknowledged the report had identified the problems, Gillespie said answers were needed, and "from his study of environmental customs and traditions in different countries...[he hoped]... to come up with a set of options for solutions."

Public policy positions

Afghanistan
When Geoffrey Millar wrote in The Asian Media Centre in 2021, that the crisis in Afghanistan was likely to result in a "big change in New Zealand's geopolitical landscape", he cited an article in which Gillespie  said that New Zealand has an ethical obligation to take more refugees. Gillespie wrote that it is likely Afghanistan would see a major increase in people fleeing persecution, [and]  "the list of who could be considered traitors or face persecution by the Taliban is long. They include religious and ethnic minorities, dissidents, women, journalists, human rights workers and those previously in positions of power....[and these people]...are at risk largely because of their support for the  Western presence in Afghanistan that New Zealand was part of." Gillespie told the NZ Herald that New Zealand and other countries need "to decide what conditions they consider basic before deciding if the Taliban are legitimate and they can enter the international stage."

Ukraine
On 30 January 2022 Gillespie said he was "optimistic" that possible issues between Russia and Ukraine could be solved with diplomacy that found a "middle ground...about arms control and confidence building with military exercises." After Russia invaded Ukraine on 22 February 2022, Gillespie was asked in a radio interview what he thought Putin's intentions were.  He said keeping an historical perspective is important and that Putin is unrestrained by the Minsk agreements in 2014 and 2015 which had left the issue of Ukraine's sovereignty unresolved, and the verbal agreement from NATO in 1994 not to expand never being formalised. Gillespie said Putin is looking to make a mark in history and establish a sphere of interest rather than rebuild the Soviet Union.  The role of the United Nations in managing this situation is seen by Gillespie as ineffective due to several countries voting against the resolution by the Security Council demanding that Russia immediately end its military operations in Ukraine, and the challenge for this body it to uphold the UN Charter and become united in protecting the sovereign rights of countries.  Gillespie warned that a failure to do this, could create a precedent for other countries to carry out invasions. He predicts that Ukraine would be taken over by Russia and NATO look to increase its influence.

When the New Zealand Government passed a law allowing sanctions to be imposed on Russia, Gillespie urged caution against "anti-Russian hysteria", and that following due process and fairness is important, and a Russian who is wealthy may not necessarily be pro-Putin. Gillespie later acknowledged that autonomous sanctions being put in place outside of the United Nations process is a break with "diplomatic tradition", but New Zealand could also offer non-lethal military assistance to Ukraine, manage the legalities around New Zealand citizens wanting to fight in Ukraine, take more refugees and consider import duties on permitted Russian imports. On Newstalk ZB, Gillespie was not prepared to predict what Putin was going to do, but stated that the sanctions are not a "declaration of war" as claimed by Putin, but an effective non-military intervention and were going to have considerable affect on Russia.

Gillespie has stated that the situation in Ukraine highlighted the relative impotency of the United Nations to live up to the principles in the founding Charter because of the power of veto over Security Council actions or intentions. He held as of 2 May 2022, that "Russian president Vladimir Putin has run his tanks over the fundamental principles of the UN Charter and disobeyed the International Court of Justice because of the unbridled power of veto...[against]...the last proposed Security Council resolution Russia...[which]...affirmed the territorial sovereignty of the Ukraine and condemned Russia's invasion as a violation of the United Nations Charter."

As Russia's blockade of food supplies leaving Ukraine looked likely to cause famine beyond the country, Gillespie said that while this is an "atrocity...[and]...invasions and war crimes are recognised as breaches of international law... causing famine as collateral damage in countries not directly related to the war is not a recognised crime." In the same piece, Gillespie does note that Geneva Conventions have prohibited the starvation of civilians as a method of war and Russia did support that in 2018. There is acceptance that these rules apply generally but are about protecting civilians within warzones, not to "prevent collateral damage to distant populations unconnected to a conflict....so while starvation of an enemy is not new, starvation of vulnerable but distant civilian populations is...it's partly a symptom of our globalised world, where interconnection, vulnerability and outdated or inadequate rules and restraints are all colliding."

When there were claims and counter claims by both Ukraine and Russia about the treatment of prisoners of war, Gillespie said that the Third Geneva Convention (1949), to which both countries are signatories, set up rules to respect the rights of prisoners.  He holds that an independent third party such as the International Criminal Court should deal with disputes about how these rules are being applied, but notes that Russia had withdrawn from the Court, reflecting 
"just another measure of how far the observation of the laws of war has been eroded in Ukraine."

One year after the Russians invaded Ukraine, and the invoking of the UN Charter and international law to achieve a sustainable peace seemed unlikely, Gillespie wrote that New Zealand, along with other Western countries, had to re-consider its approach to the conflict. He acknowledges that while the country did not send troops to the area, neither had it taken the position of neutrality, or "remained indifferent to the aggression and atrocities, or their implications for a rule-based world." One important consideration for New Zealand Gillespie contents, is the review of its defence budget and whether it is sufficient to retain collaborative arrangements and alliances.  From that point, the country's government must decide if it is going move beyond being a regional 'police officer' [to] "carry its fair share of being part of an interlinked modern military deterrent." This would also require a review of the contribution to humanitarian assistance, possibly resulting in more direct funding or widening the visa arrangements to allow a greater number of refugees from Ukraine into New Zealand. Significant also to Gillespie, is how New Zealand diplomatically develops its vision of peace and deals with [the] "hard questions about territorial integrity, accountability for war crimes, reparations and what might happen to populations that don’t want to be part of Ukraine."  At the time of writing, Gillespie notes that China's role and intentions in the area are uncertain and if they supplied arms directly to Russian, New Zealand would be under pressure to take measures that could adversely affect their trading relations with them. The final consideration noted by Gillespie is that the nuclear threat should be taken seriously by New Zealand [because] "if the Ukraine war spins out of control, [the country] would be in an emergency unlike anything it's witnessed before."

New Zealand's relationship with China
In 2020 following the release of a statement by Five Eyes, an international alliance to which New Zealand belonged, that stated China was in breach of its international obligations by not the respecting the autonomy of Hong Kong, Gillespie said that the Five Eyes statement is "fair and not inflammatory...[and that]... China's actions are not consistent with the promises China made over Hong Kong when it was handed back in 1997." Gillespie saw the challenge for New Zealand not to offend China, either as an important trading partner or more traditional allies, but it would be reasonable for Five Eyes to expect New Zealand to regularly speak up on such issues.

An article in the New Zealand media in 2021 that noted Nanaia Mahuta had not directly criticised China for their treatment of the Uyghurs, cited an article by Gillespie in which he said that New Zealand "sticking to the middle ground will look less like wise diplomacy and more like appeasement" and  warns that other democracies could form new alliances, such as the Quadrilateral Security Dialogue (Quad), without including New Zealand.

As New Zealand consolidated trading agreements with China in February 2022, concerns were raised on Radio New Zealand about whether that country's human rights record, including an alleged "genocide" against Uighur Muslims, might affect relationships between the two countries. Gillespie said China has a history of attempting to assimilate Muslim populations into a "collective identity" that have resulted in many improvements for the Chinese people, but because New Zealand is somewhat hamstrung by an economic dependency on China, they are reticent to criticize them for alleged human rights, often in contrast to the approach of Australia.  He predicted that while in principle, putting pressure on China to be more open is correct, the response of the New Zealand government is likely to be cautious.

COVID-19
When New Zealand went into its first lockdown in March 2020, Gillespie said that people could be fined under laws at the time for flouting the lockdown rules, but suggested Prime Minister Jacinda Ardern would also declare a state of emergency and issue an epidemic notice under the 2006 Epidemic Preparedness Act. Gillespie explained that the notice allowed the government to "change existing laws, subject to only a few safeguards of review, some civil rights and constitutional structure...[and]... if deemed absolutely necessary, the government can do nearly anything that needs to be done to stop the epidemic of COVID-19 in New Zealand."

Gillespie suggested that under emergency legislation to manage the pandemic, people in the country could have some infringements of their rights, however that as long as the restrictions remain "precautionary and in proportion to the risk, it is unlikely they will be challenged seriously." He had previously told The Panel on RNZ that there are three rules in New Zealand needing to be updated to manage the pandemic. These are laws around quarantining, compulsory vaccinations and spitting, which is classed as common assault under the Summary Offences Act 1981. Writing in The Conversation on 19 May 2020, Gillespie said the New Zealand Government's handling has been both praised and criticised, with accusations of illegality possibly playing on fears that the new law is a "lurch towards authoritarianism under cover of the pandemic." He accepts that in future, laws in these situations would need more scrutiny and oversight.

As Auckland prepared for another lockdown in August 2020, Gillespie said the laws being enacted have a "raft of power behind them...[concluding that]...this time, if it gets worse, I don't think you are going to see community road-blocks; while powers over issues such as mandatory testing are very clear."

In November 2021 when there was a growing number of protests against the response of the New Zealand government to COVID-19, causing the Prime Minister Jacinda Ardern to abandon events to support the roll out of the vaccine, Gillespie co-authored an opinion piece that held while there are some "legal underpinnings of the right to protest, specific protest actions must be in accordance with the law...[and]...must not be unduly disorderly, violent or unsafe." In the same article, the writers said it is important for the police to uphold the law, but in the interests of keeping the peace and the public safe, the preferred approach is de-escalation and "any intervention should only be taken at the highest level of the police force, when there is no other means to protect the public order from an imminent risk of violence."

By early February 2022 when the Wellington protest was underway, Gillespie told Newstalk ZB that the police could clear protesters off parliamentary grounds to maintain security, and while noting that negotiation is preferable, added that the situation is "coming to a climax and it may not end well."

Gillespie was not surprised that an online poll of 525 people in February 2022 had shown 28 percent opposed the vaccine mandates in place in New Zealand and 29 percent supported the protest on the lawns of Parliament. He said that it  is the responsibility of the Government to show that mandates are necessary in the interests of public safety, and that "any restrictions on liberties must continually be justified through a democratic process and for that you need a free press and you need a functioning Parliament." He expressed concern about death threats and hate speech from some of the protestors at Parliament because it is a crime within the Crimes Act and there needs to be "zero tolerance when it's towards journalists or parliamentarians."

Awards
Gillespie, along with Siouxsie Wiles, received the 2021 Critic and Conscience of Society Award, in  recognition of his public commenting on COVID-19, "terrorism, cannabis law reform, and gun regulation." The award, which includes a grant, is given annually to an academic staff member who has been judged by an independent panel to have provided the public with "expert commentary on an issue or issues affecting the New Zealand community or future generations."

In 2019, Gillespie won the Francqui medal, also known as the International Francqui Professor Chair. As a requirement of the award, Gillespie presented a lecture entitled 2050: The Challenge of Peace and Sustainability in a Fragmented International Context, about which he said "I talked about the state of the world today, the challenges we’re likely to face in the next few decades, covering law and politics in the international sphere, from the risks of environmental change, and conflict.

Gillespie was awarded The New Zealand Law Foundation International Research Fellowship in 2003 for his research into "legal principles, policy and science of biodiversity, wildlife and ecosystems within international law", and the selection panel, comprising Sir Ivor Richardson, Justice Bruce Robertson and Professor Richard Sutton, said Gillespie's application showed that he had "the rare ability to synthesise the interdisciplinary science, law and social policy issues involved".

Gillespie was awarded the Fulbright Research Scholarship in 1998.

Selected publications
The Causes of War : Volume IV: 1650 - 1800 (2021). This is the fourth volume of a projected five-volume series that explores the causes of war from 3000 BCE to the 21st century by documenting the history of international law within treaties and how they were negotiated.

The Long Road to Sustainability: The Past, Present, and Future of International Environmental Law and Policy (2018). Gillespie considers why humanity has struggled to achieve sustainable development over several thousand of years, and takes the approach  [that] "economic, social, and environmental conundrums have stalled the quest for the long term viability of both our species and the ecosystems in which we reside."

Waste Policy: International Regulation, Comparative and Contextual Perspectives (2015). In this book, Gillespie takes the position that all forms of waste are "expanding exponentially, and are often of a hazardous nature...[and this has]..legal and political implications." Klaus Bosselmann from the University of Auckland, New Zealand, reviewed the book and said that it shows how smart policies can lead to minimizing waste and to creating material flows consistent with ecological flows."

International Environmental Law, Policy, and Ethics: Second Edition (2014). This second edition challenges the assumption that there are shared goals amongst nations when it comes to protecting the international environment and shows across nations there are laws and policies that are inconsistent and contradictory and likely to fail. In a review of the first edition, Lawyers Weekly described the book [as] "a short but incisive review of the foundations of international environmental law ...[and]... Gillespie is impressive in his use of a plethora of international environmental conventions, declarations and statements to support his arguments."

A history of the laws of war: Volume 3 The Customs and Laws of War with Regards to Arms Control (2011). The third volume in this series, examines the control of weaponry from the Bronze Age to the Nuclear Age. The American Society of International Law Newsletter, in reviewing the book said [that] the three volumes "provide a vivid, detailed, and especially readable account of the [law of war]."

Conservation, biodiversity and international law (2011). This book examines the debates about conservation at the global level within the context of legal frameworks that can pull together "the issues of science, ethics and policy." Francesco Bandarin, UNESCO Assistant Director-General for Culture, said the book offered "a complete guide to the complex world of treaties that regulate conservation at the global scale."

The Illusion of Progress: Unsustainable Development in International Law and Policy (2001). This book critiques  sustainability and argues that the "real issues such as consumption, population growth and equity are either sidestepped or manipulated in international policy and law." The (UK) Journal of Environmental Law reviewed the book as having "powerful arguments against the logic of the existing situation...[and is|...a challenging and thought provoking work that makes us consider the direction that the international community is headed... "

References

External links
 Gillespie speaking at Hamilton Public Lecture Series 'Critic and Conscience of Society' March 2022
 Alexander Gillespie: Al Jazeera News

Living people
New Zealand academics
New Zealand legal scholars
Academic staff of the University of Waikato
Year of birth missing (living people)